Michael Gabras (c. 1290 – after 1350) was a Byzantine official and writer. A lowly scribe in the imperial chancery, Gabras' life is relatively obscure except through his voluminous correspondence. Anthony Bryer, who studied the Byzantine Empire, called him "the most prolific of all Byzantine letter writers." 

Gabras' 462 letters span the period 1305–1341, and his 111 correspondents include most of the major political and literary figures of his day. He also had a brother, John, who wrote a theological treatise against the doctrines of Gregory Palamas.

References

Sources
 
 
 

1290 births
14th-century deaths
14th-century Byzantine people
Byzantine writers
Michael
Byzantine letter writers
14th-century Byzantine writers